Marie Carré (1905-1984) was a French Protestant nurse who later in life converted to become a Roman Catholic nun. She is known primarily in the English-speaking world for having published a purported memoir entitled AA-1025: The Memoirs of an Anti-Apostle, which some consider to be Traditionalist Catholic propaganda.

Life

Carré grew up a Calvinist Protestant in France. In 1964, she converted to Catholicism and became a nun much later in life. A picture of Carré was made available on the Internet by Chiré: Diffusion de la Pensee Francaise.

AA-1025: The Memoirs of an Anti-Apostle

While working as a nurse in a Paris hospital in the late 1960s, Carré claimed that a severely injured man, who had a Slavic look, was brought in after being in a car accident. Carré tried to communicate with the man to ask him some questions but he didn't or couldn't respond. She even tried to get him to answer her questions by blinking his eyes but he didn't. The man survived for a few hours before he succumbed to his injuries. Having no form of identification Carré was instructed to go through his belongings in order to possibly identify him. She did not succeed in discovering his name, but she did discover in his briefcase a 100-page-typed memoir. She began reading the papers partly to find some information to identify him and partly out of curiosity.

The memoir claimed that he was an undercover agent of the Soviet Union ordered to infiltrate the Catholic Church by becoming a priest and to advance modernist ideas through a teaching position that would undermine the main teachings of the Church during the Second Vatican Council in subtle ways, by turn of phrase methods. The document gave details and even told of a murder of a priest he had committed in order to get his way. No one ever claimed his belongings and Carré eventually decided to publish the memoir. It was printed in France in May 1972 and eventually was translated into several other languages.

Criticism

In a 2002 critique of Catholic conspiracy theories for Crisis magazine, Sandra Miesel wrote:

Catholic philosopher and theologian Alice von Hildebrand argues that:

Death

Carré died in France in 1984.

Bibliography
Les J3 Contre Lucifer (French, 1958, Coutances, Éditions Notre-Dame).
La Belle et la mort (French, Paris, Mignard, 1962).
J'ai choisi l'unité (French, 1964, Apostolat des Éditions).
Les mémoires d'une jeune fille gaie (French, 1965, Paris, Nouvelles Éditions Debresse).
Yo escogí la unidad (Spanish, 1968, Edic. Paulinas).
Vie de Jésus (French, 1970, Ed. Saint Michel; Extrait de "Itinéraires". 117–128, novembre 1967-décembre 1968).
La messe. Lettre ouverte à Jésus de Nazareth en Galilée (French, 1973, Ed. Diffusion de la Pensée Française).
Es 1025, ou les mémoires d'un anti-apôtre (French, 1973).
L'Islam et nous (French, 1975, Paris : La Pensée universelle).
Es 1025 ou les memoires d'un Anti-Apôtre (French, 1978, Éditions Du Chiré, Chiré-en-Montreuil France).
Dood aan de kerk of de gedenkschriften van een tegenapostel : ES 1025 (Dutch, 1973, Gent, Leven en Aktie).
Le Pasteur des Pasteurs (French, 1980, Ed. Paris, TEQUI).
AA-1025: The Memoirs of an Anti-Apostle (English, 1991, TAN Books).

See also
 Bella Dodd

Notes

1984 deaths
French anti-communists
20th-century French nuns
French traditionalist Catholics
Traditionalist Catholic conspiracy theorists
Traditionalist Catholic writers
Year of birth unknown
Converts to Roman Catholicism from Calvinism
1905 births
French conspiracy theorists